The Diocese of Copenhagen is a Latin Church ecclesiastical territory or diocese of the Catholic Church named after its episcopal see, the Danish national capital, Copenhagen and covers all Denmark. As in neighbouring provinces, none of the pre-Reformation bishoprics were re-established after Lutheranism became the new official state church in the 16th century). The diocese also covers two Danish overseas possessions, the Faroe Islands and Greenland. It is estimated that 36,000 (0.7%) out of the 5,516,597 inhabitants of the diocesan territory are Catholics.

The current bishop, appointed in 1995, is Czeslaw Kozon. His predecessor, bishop Hans Ludvig Martensen, S.J., served in the position from 1965 to 1995, when he resigned the post. The principal church of the diocese is St. Ansgar's Cathedral.

The former Dioceses of Ribe and Odense were the former provincial dioceses, that have since been subsumed into the diocese of Copenhagen. The Diocese of Copenhagen is exempt immediately to the Holy See. 

It was established on August 7, 1868 as the Vicariate Apostolic of the Northern Missions. In 1869, it was demoted as the Apostolic Prefecture of Denmark. On March 15, 1892, it was again promoted as the Vicariate Apostolic of Denmark. Only on April 29, 1953 it was promoted as the regular, post-missionary diocese of Copenhagen.

Bishops of the Diocese
The Rev. Hermann Grüder (Prefect of Denmark: 1869–1883)
The Most Rev. Johannes Von Euch (Prefect of Denmark: 1883–1894; Vicar Apostolic of Denmark: 1894–1922)
The Most Rev. Josef Ludwig Brems, O.Praem (Vicar Apostolic of Denmark: 1922–1938)
The Most Rev. Johannes Theodor Suhr, O.S.B. (Vicar Apostolic of Denmark: 1939–1953; Bishop of Copenhagen: 1953–1964)
The Most Rev. Hans Ludvig Martensen, S.J. (Bishop of Copenhagen: 1965–1995)
The Most Rev. Czeslaw Kozon (Bishop of Copenhagen: 1995–current)

See also
Christ the King Church, Nuuk, Greenland
List of Roman Catholic dioceses in Nordic Europe

References

External links
Diocese of Copenhagen homepage
GCatholic.org
Catholic Hierarchy

Diocese of Copenhagen
Diocese of Copenhagen
Diocese of Copenhagen
Roman Catholic dioceses in Nordic Europe
Diocese of Copenhagen
Roman Catholic dioceses and prelatures established in the 19th century
Diocese of Copenhagen
Roman Catholic dioceses in Denmark